Gerald Wilburn Page (born August 12, 1939) is an American writer of fantasy, science fiction, mystery and horror.  He was born in Chattanooga, Tennessee on August 12, 1939.  He sold his first story to the magazine Analog where it appeared in 1963.

Page acquired Coven 13 magazine from Arthur H. Landis and retitled it Witchcraft and Sorcery Under that title the magazine lasted for six issues. and became editor with Jerry Burge as art director.

In 1969 he joined the editorial staff of TV Guide.

He edited DAW Books's anthology series The Year's Best Horror Stories from 1976 to 1979.

His story "Worldsong" appears in his anthology Nameless Places (Arkham House, 1975).

References

Sources

External links
 
  
 

1939 births
Living people
American short story writers
American horror writers
American fantasy writers
American male short story writers
American male novelists